Manding may refer to:

 Manding languages, a language-dialect continuum in West Africa
 Mandinka (disambiguation)
 Mandinka language, one of the Manding languages
 Mandinka people, a West African ethnic group
 The Mandé peoples who speak Manding languages: Mandinka, Malinké, Bambara, and Dyula
 Manding Mountains in western Mali

Language and nationality disambiguation pages